Danica Ludlow (born August 30, 1996) is a Canadian competitive swimmer who specializes in the medley events.

Ludlow was born in Sydney, Australia but moved to Canada when she was 11.

Career
In 2019, Ludlow won a silver medal at the 2019 Pan American Games in Lima, Peru in the 400 metres individual freestyle race along with the 4 × 200 m freestyle relay.

References

1996 births
Living people
Canadian female swimmers
Canadian people of Australian descent
Swimmers from Sydney
Swimmers at the 2019 Pan American Games
Pan American Games medalists in swimming
Pan American Games silver medalists for Canada
Medalists at the 2019 Pan American Games
21st-century Canadian women